Bosistoa floydii, commonly known as the five-leaf bosistoa or five-leaved bonewood, is a species of small rainforest tree that is endemic to north-eastern New South Wales. It has pinnate leaves usually with five elliptic leaflets, and panicles of tiny, creamy white flowers.

Description
The leaflets have prominent oli glands and a pointed tip. Flowering is followed by one, or rarely two small, warty, woody, yellow-brown fruit that ripen in February.

Taxonomy
Bosistoa floydii was first described in 1977 by Thomas Gordon Hartley who published the description in the Journal of the Arnold Arboretum. The generic name Bosistoa honours the name of Joseph Bosisto, a manufacturer of essential oils. The specific epithet floydii honours the eminent Australian rainforest botanist Alexander Floyd.

Distribution and habitat
Five-leaf bosistoa is restricted to subtropical rainforest in the Bellinger and Orara River areas in north-eastern New South Wales, where it grows on basalt or rich alluvial soils.

References

floydii
Sapindales of Australia
Flora of New South Wales
Trees of Australia
Plants described in 1977
Taxa named by Thomas Gordon Hartley